North Richmond may refer to:

Places in Australia
North Richmond, New South Wales
North Richmond, Victoria

Places in USA
North Richmond, California